William Grier (born April 3, 1995) is an American football quarterback for the Dallas Cowboys of the National Football League (NFL). He played college football at Florida and West Virginia and was drafted by the Carolina Panthers in the third round in the 2019 NFL Draft.

Early years
Grier attended SouthLake Christian Academy in Huntersville, North Carolina, then transferred to Davidson Day School in Davidson, North Carolina. As a junior, he threw for a national record 837 yards in a game, breaking the old record of 764. As a senior, he had 4,989 passing yards with a nation-leading and North Carolina record 77 touchdowns. He also rushed for 1,251 yards with 13 touchdowns. He was named the Parade All-American Player of the Year and Mr. Football USA. For his career, Grier had 14,565 passing yards, a state record 195 touchdown passes, 2,955 rushing yards and 31 rushing touchdowns.

Grier was rated by Rivals.com as a four-star recruit and was ranked as the second best dual-threat quarterback in his class and 46th player overall. Grier was offered scholarships to play football at Auburn, Arkansas, Florida, North Carolina, Tennessee, and Wake Forest. He committed to play quarterback at the University of Florida.

College career

Florida
Grier competed with Treon Harris to be Jeff Driskel's backup as a freshman in 2014, ultimately redshirting the season. As a redshirt freshman in 2015, he competed with Harris to be the starting quarterback. Although Harris started the first game of the season against New Mexico State, Grier received playing time, attempting 18 passes and completing 16 for 166 yards with two touchdowns. He rushed for 43 yards with a touchdown. Grier started the second game, against East Carolina, throwing for 151 yards, two touchdowns and an interception. On October 3, against the Ole Miss Rebels, he had the best game of his young career, going 24-of-29 for 271 yards and four passing touchdowns. He threw his four touchdowns in the first half; he was the first Gator quarterback since Chris Leak in 2005 to accomplish the feat. The game ended up being a 38–10 win for the Gators.

Grier received a one-year suspension, effective October 12, 2015, after it was revealed that he had tested positive for performance-enhancing drugs. He said the positive test stems from the over-the-counter supplement Ligandrol, and that he was not aware it was banned, while also admitting he never followed protocol to clear the supplement with team trainers. His appeal was rejected by the NCAA, and he would not be eligible to return until the sixth game of the regular season in 2016. On December 19, 2015, Florida announced that Grier planned to transfer to another school.

West Virginia
On April 6, 2016, Grier announced that he was transferring to West Virginia University. He sat out the 2016 season per NCAA transfer rules. Grier was the presumed starter for West Virginia heading into the 2017 season, but there were questions surrounding his eligibility, since half of his year-long suspension was served in conjunction with his transfer waiting period. On June 20, 2017, West Virginia head coach Dana Holgerson announced that the NCAA had granted Grier a waiver and he would be eligible to play in the season opener against Virginia Tech. In his first game with the Mountaineers, Grier threw for 371 yards, three touchdowns and an interception in a 31–24 loss to Virginia Tech. Grier threw for 352 yards and five touchdowns in a come-from-behind victory over then-No. 24 Texas Tech on October 14, and was named Big 12 Offensive Player of the Week. In the Mountaineers’ 11th game of the season, against Texas, Grier left the game in the second quarter with a broken finger on his throwing hand. Grier had surgery on the broken finger and missed the remainder of the season, finishing with 3,490 passing yards and 36 total touchdowns on the year. At the conclusion of the season, Grier was awarded as Big 12 Offensive Newcomer of the Year.

On December 14, 2017, Grier announced he would be returning for his senior season rather than entering the 2018 NFL Draft. He was listed on preseason watch lists for several national awards, including the Maxwell Award, Walter Camp Award, and Davey O'Brien Award. Grier appeared in several preseason lists of potential Heisman Trophy candidates. At the 2018 Big 12 Media Days, he was announced as the conference's Preseason Offensive Player of the Year and a preseason first-team all-conference selection.

Grier finished the 2018 season with 3,864 passing yards, 37 touchdowns, and eight interceptions. He was named second-team All-Big 12 at the conclusion of the regular season. West Virginia finished with an 8–3 regular season record and was invited to the Camping World Bowl; Grier announced that he would not play in the bowl game, in order to prepare for the 2019 NFL Draft. Grier would be named the winner of the 2018 Senior CLASS Award for FBS football as the outstanding senior student-athlete in that grouping of schools.

College statistics

Professional career

Carolina Panthers
Grier was drafted by the Carolina Panthers in the third round (100th overall) in the 2019 NFL Draft.

On December 16, 2019, it was announced that Grier would be making his first career start in week 16 against the Indianapolis Colts. During the game, Grier threw for 224 yards and three interceptions and rushed for 17 yards during the 38–6 loss. In Week 17 against the New Orleans Saints, Grier threw for four yards and a pick-six before exiting the game due to a foot injury in the second quarter.  The Panthers lost the game 42–10.

On August 31, 2021, Grier was released by the Panthers.

Dallas Cowboys
Grier was claimed off waivers by the Dallas Cowboys on September 1, 2021.

On August 30, 2022, Grier was waived by the Cowboys and signed to the practice squad the next day. He was promoted to the active roster on October 5.

NFL career statistics

Personal life 
Grier is from Charlotte, North Carolina and is the oldest child of Chad Grier and Elizabeth Grier-Floyd. His father is a football coach and was a former quarterback for the East Carolina Pirates. He has two brothers, Nash and Hayes, a half-sister, Skylynn Elizabeth Floyd and a half-brother, John Henry "Hank" Grier. Nash, Hayes and Skylynn were popular users of Vine, the defunct video sharing service. Grier is married to Jeanne Marie O'Neil Grier and their first daughter was born on November 10, 2016. She gave birth to their second daughter on January 28, 2020.

References

External links
Florida Gators bio
West Virginia Mountaineers bio

1995 births
Living people
American football quarterbacks
American sportspeople in doping cases
Doping cases in American football
Florida Gators football players
People from Davidson, North Carolina
Players of American football from Charlotte, North Carolina
West Virginia Mountaineers football players
Carolina Panthers players
Dallas Cowboys players